Ahn Jin-beom (born 10 March 1992) is a South Korean footballer who plays as midfielder for Seongnam FC in K League 1.

Club career
He moved to Ulsan Hyundai in exchange for Choi Jin-soo right after he joined FC Anyang in February 2014.

References

External links 

1992 births
Living people
Association football midfielders
South Korean footballers
FC Anyang players
Ulsan Hyundai FC players
Gimcheon Sangmu FC players
K League 2 players
K League 1 players
Korea University alumni
Sportspeople from Jeju Province